Rosalin "Roos" Drost also known as Rosalin Drost (born 2 May 1991) is a Dutch women's field hockey player who plays for Netherlands women's national field hockey team. Drost made her international debut on 4 February 2013 against South Africa similar to fellow player Malou Pheninckx. She was a key member of the Dutch team which became glorious at the 2012–13 Women's FIH Hockey World League, 2013 Women's Hockey Investec Cup and in the 2014 Women's Hockey World Cup.

Career 
She played the key role during the Dutch side's maiden triumph in the 2012–13 Women's FIH Hockey World League defeating Australia 5–1 in the Women's Hockey World League final. She also scored a goal in the final as Netherlands clinched its first ever FIH Hockey World League title.

Rosalin Drost was also the member of the Netherlands women's team which won the 2013 Women's Hockey Investec Cup. Netherlands defeated South Africa 4–2 in the final to clinch second consecutive Women's Hockey Investec Cup. She also scored a winning goal in the final against South Africa and finished as the second top goalscorer for Dutch side with 2 goals.

Roos Drost was also the part of the Dutch team which secured its 7th World Cup title after emerging victorious at the 2014 Women's Hockey World Cup.

References 

1991 births
Living people
Dutch female field hockey players
Sportspeople from Utrecht (city)
SV Kampong players
SCHC players